KDOV may refer to:

 The ICAO code for Dover Air Force Base
 KDOV (FM), a radio station (91.7) licensed to serve Medford, Oregon, United States
 KDOV-LD, a low-power television station (channel 18) licensed to serve Medford, Oregon
 KDSO-LD, a low-power television station (channel 24, virtual 16) licensed to serve Medford, Oregon, which held the call sign KDOV-LP from 2009 to 2018